"My Heart Goes Bang" is a 1985 song by English pop band Dead or Alive. It was the fourth and final single from the band's second studio album Youthquake. It peaked at No. 23 in the United Kingdom, No. 12 in Japan, and became a dance hit in the U.S.

Remixes
A 7" remix and two 12" extended remixes of the single were released. My Heart Goes Bang (Get Me To The Doctor) (Extended Remix), and a unique version with uncredited additional guitar by Matt Aitken as My Heart Goes Bang (Get Me To The Doctor) (American 'WIPE-OUT' Mix).

The song was then remixed a third time for Dead or Alive's compilation album, Rip It Up, released in the fall of 1987.

"My Heart Goes Bang" was again remixed and re-recorded for Fragile (2000) and Unbreakable (2001) which were only available on Avex Trax in Japan.

Music video
Parts of the music video depict lead singer Pete Burns in a leather jacket on the back of a motorcycle, and the band walking down a catwalk in sunglasses. No official music videos were released for the Japanese versions released in 2000.

Track listing

Chart performance

References

External links

1985 singles
1985 songs
Dead or Alive (band) songs
Epic Records singles
Song recordings produced by Stock Aitken Waterman
Songs written by Pete Burns
Songs written by Tim Lever
Songs written by Mike Percy (musician)